Wila Quta (Aymara for the skin of an animal, "red lake", also spelled Wila Kkota) is a mountain in the Bolivian Andes which reaches a height of approximately . It is located in the Cochabamba Department, Ayopaya Province, Ayopaya Municipality. Wila Quta lies north of the Wila Quta River (Huilakhota, Wila Kkota), northeast of Lip'ichi.

References 

Mountains of Cochabamba Department